Maclear Island is part of the Great Barrier Reef Marine Park at the tip of Cape Melville, Queensland in Bathurst Bay.

It is north of Denham Island in the Flinders Group National Park and south of Flinders Island, at Latitude -14.210 and Longitude 144.250.

It is named after John Maclear.

References

Islands on the Great Barrier Reef
Uninhabited islands of Australia
Islands of Far North Queensland
Protected areas of Far North Queensland